Gracia Arabella Baur (born 18 November 1982) is a German singer and songwriter. She rose to fame as a finalist on the debut season of the television series Deutschland sucht den Superstar, the German Idol series adaptation, placing fifth.

Biography
Gracia was born in Munich on 18 November 1982 to Roman and Rosemary Baur and was named after Princess Grace (Gracia Patricia) of Monaco, who had died a few weeks earlier. Gracia's identical twin sister was called Patricia after the princess.

During her teenage years she took vocal lessons to strengthen her voice. To fulfill her dreams of a career as a professional singer, she started recording demos and passed several auditions. In 2000, she even made it through the first round of Popstars, but was forced out when she forgot the words of her song.

In 2002/2003, she took part in Deutschland sucht den Superstar, the German version of Pop Idol, and eventually reached #5. Pushed by the publicity she released her first album Intoxicated, which peaked at #10 on the German album charts and spawned the hit singles "I Don't Think So" and "I Believe In Miracles". Afterwards, she teamed up with fellow DSDS runners-up Daniel Küblböck, Nektarios Bamiatzis, and Stephanie Brauckmeyer, releasing the charity single "Don't Close Your Eyes" under the name 4 United.

Gracia was selected to represent Germany in the Eurovision Song Contest with the song "Run & Hide", produced and composed by David Brandes. After the German national pre-selection for the Eurovision Song Contest it was revealed that Brandes had bought thousands of his own CDs to ensure chart placement, a requirement of the pre-selection (the single had actually hit the top 30 on the German charts). In contrast to the Swiss entry Vanilla Ninja, who had also had their entry produced by Brandes, Gracia opted to continue her association with the newly controversial figure.

However, "Run & Hide", a modern pop-rock song with heavy use of synthesizers, failed to catch the audience's imagination in the Eurovision Song Contest and ignominiously placed last (24th), with just four points awarded from Moldova and Monaco. Gracia, however, was not deterred ("Well, somebody has to finish last" was her laconic comment after the show), and went on with her second solo album Passion, released in November 2005.

2004 she recorded Götter der Ewigkeit, part of the German soundtrack of the Walt Disney Feature Animation Brother Bear.

In December 2006, Gracia released the Song "Cos I believe" together with Marvin Broadie under the name "Xantoo". It charted at #39.

Discography

Studio albums

Singles

See also
 Eurovision Song Contest 2005
 Germany in the Eurovision Song Contest

References

German pop singers
Deutschland sucht den Superstar participants
Eurovision Song Contest entrants for Germany
Eurovision Song Contest entrants of 2005
Musicians from Munich
Sony BMG artists
1982 births
Living people
Women television personalities
German twins
21st-century German women singers